Monforte San Giorgio (Sicilian: Munforti)  is a comune (municipality) in the Metropolitan City of Messina in the Italian region Sicily, located about  east of Palermo and about  west of Messina.

It is home to the remains of a  castle built by the local Orthodox monks to resist the Arab attacks. Later it was used by the Normans and the royal houses of Hohenstaufen and Anjou.

References

Cities and towns in Sicily
Castles in Italy